Prairie Township is one of twelve townships in White County, Indiana, United States. As of the 2010 census, its population was 3,180 and it contained 1,311 housing units.

Prairie Township was organized in 1834. The township was named for the open prairies within its borders.

Geography

Cities, towns, villages
 Brookston

Unincorporated towns
 Badger Grove at 
 Springboro at 
(This list is based on USGS data and may include former settlements.)

Adjacent townships
 Big Creek Township (north)
 Jefferson Township, Carroll County (northeast)
 Tippecanoe Township, Carroll County (east)
 Tippecanoe Township, Tippecanoe County (south)
 Wabash Township, Tippecanoe County (southwest)
 Round Grove Township (west)
 West Point Township (northwest)

Cemeteries
The township contains these six cemeteries: Carr, Chalmers, Harvey and Phebus, Independent Order of Odd Fellows, Smelcer and Spring Creek.

Airports and landing strips
 Bartlett Airport

Rivers
 Tippecanoe River

Education
 Frontier School Corporation

Prairie Township is served by the Brookston-Prairie Township Public Library.

Political districts
 Indiana's 4th congressional district
 State House District 15
 State House District 24
 State Senate District 07

References
 United States Census Bureau 2007 TIGER/Line Shapefiles
 United States Board on Geographic Names (GNIS)
 IndianaMap

External links
 Indiana Township Association
 United Township Association of Indiana

Townships in White County, Indiana
Townships in Indiana